Nanamagari Tameike is an earthen dam located in Saga Prefecture in Japan. The dam is used for agriculture. The dam impounds about 1  ha of land when full and can store 69 thousand cubic meters of water. The construction of the dam was completed in 1973.

References

Dams in Saga Prefecture
1973 establishments in Japan